Francesco Gaeta may refer to:

 Francesco Gaeta (poet) (1879–1927), Italian poet
 Francesco Gaeta (bishop) (1605–1669), Italian Roman Catholic bishop